Ralph "Tiger" Jones (March 14, 1928 – August 20, 1994) was a boxer during the 1950s. Trained by Gil Clancy, Jones was a fixture of televised boxing in the 1950s, known for an aggressive style that pleased fans. His overall record was 52 victories, 32 losses and five draws.

He became a professional boxer in 1950. In 1955 he scored an upset over Sugar Ray Robinson. Robinson was highly favored in the fight, which was Robinson's second during a comeback. That was only one of his wins against top-level fighters of that era. He also beat Joey Giardello and Kid Gavilán (both these fighters were world champions at one time and, in other fights, also defeated Jones). Fighters to whom he lost include world champions Gene Fullmer, Johnny Saxton, Paul Pender, and Carl "Bobo" Olson. In all, he fought six world champions on ten occasions.

After he retired, Jones drove a cab and worked for a canning company.  He was survived by three sons and two grandchildren.

Professional boxing record

External links

References

1928 births
1994 deaths
Middleweight boxers
Boxers from New York City
Sportspeople from Brooklyn
American male boxers